Rail Baron is a railroad board game for 3 to 6 players.

Rail Baron was initially published in the 1970s under the name Boxcars by the original designers R.S. Erickson and T.F. Erickson, Jr. It was soon acquired, renamed and reissued by Avalon Hill.

Gameplay
Rail Baron is played on a map of the United States on which the routes of 28 historic railroads, such as the Baltimore & Ohio and the Southern Pacific have been marked. The map is divided into seven regions, Northeast, Southeast, North Central, South Central, Plains, Northwest and Southwest. Major US cities which are connected by the railroads act as destinations for travel. Dots on the railroad routes represent small towns along the way, and serve as distance markers for player movement.

The goal of each player is to accumulate money by moving his or her train token to map destinations which are generated at random via a lookup table. Large cities like New York and Chicago are more likely to be generated as destinations than small cities. Travel from one destination to the next is accomplished by rolling dice to determine distance that can be moved. Players then move their train token along map dots toward their destination.

Upon arrival at a destination, the player collects a cash payoff, and may use the money to upgrade his or her train engine to a faster model, or purchase a railroad. Railroad purchases are key to the game because an owner collects substantial fees from other players who ride his or her railroad during their movement. Meanwhile, the owner can ride his or her own railroads at no cost. Thus, an important decision in the game is whether to buy a variety of railroads in order to gain access to all areas of the map for oneself, or to buy railroads in a given area in order to monopolize it and collect the valuable use fees from opponents.

Winning
To win the game a player must accumulate $200,000 and then make a daring run back to their home city (their first city in the game) before any opponent can catch them via what is known as a rover play.

Railroads
The 28 railroads depicted in the game correspond to 28 actual real-life railroads that operated in the early 20th century.  The table below lists these 28 railroads, their cost within the Rail Baron game, their real-life years of operation and eventual corporate outcome, and their current status as of 2009.

¹ = As of September, 2009

Variants
Several variants are gaining in popularity. The "Home Swap" lets players switch the home city and first destination before moving for the first time in case their first destination is an easily monopolizable one, or if they want to try to get a better home city. "Free Superchief" lets players upgrade to a SuperChief engine at no cost if they already have an Express engine; this both speeds the game and lessens the dominance of the Pennsylvania RR.

Fans of the game have created dozens of alternate maps for play. There now exist game maps of Europe, New York City, Colorado, and many other locations, as well as fictional regions. There is also a computer version which both speeds play and supports online multiplayer matches.

Reviews
 Casus Belli #33 (June 1986)
1982 Games 100 in Games
Jeux & Stratégie #13

References

External links

An Illustrated History of Rail Baron at Rail Game Fans
Command line utilities for game play

Avalon Hill games
Board games introduced in 1974
Board games introduced in 1977
Railroad board games